Ning Yuqing (born 9 May 1994) is a Chinese tennis player.

Ning has a career high ATP singles ranking of 821 achieved on 17 August 2015. He also has a career high ATP doubles ranking of 546 achieved on 27 June 2016.

Ning made his ATP main draw debut at the 2014 China Open in the doubles draw partnering Liu Siyu.

External links

1994 births
Living people
Chinese male tennis players
Sportspeople from Nanjing
Tennis players from Jiangsu
21st-century Chinese people